Unleash the Love is the second solo studio album by American singer Mike Love. It was released on November 17, 2017.

Background and production 
Before Unleash the Love, Mike Love had not officially released a solo album since 1981's Looking Back with Love, released 36 years earlier.

Unleash the Love initially had the title of Mike Love Not War, but that got shelved during the recording process. The term Mike Love Not War had previously been used in a variety of contexts, such as being placed on t-shirts and adopted as a title for an extended play by indie pop group Smudge.

Speaking with The Guardian in 2013, Love stated that he'd "stockpiled" a collection of songs for possible release "for decades". However, he'd hesitated due to needing to assemble the proper "team to get my music out". Broadly speaking, Love aimed to have the release remark upon "the hopes and aspirations of those on the planet who like to see more positivity and harmony."

Track listing
All tracks composed by Mike Love except where noted.

All tracks composed by Mike Love and Brian Wilson except where noted.

Personnel
Mike Love – vocals
Bruce Johnston – vocals
Scott Totten – guitar, backing vocals
Randy Leago – saxophone
John Ferraro – drums
Jim Cox – keyboards
Tim Pierce – guitar
Paul III – bass guitar
Michael Lloyd – keyboards, guitar, drums, bass guitar
Carl Wilson – vocals on "Brian's Back"
Jeffrey Foskett – rhythm guitar
Curt Bisquera – drums
Joel Peskin – tenor saxophone
Brian Eichenberger – bass guitar, backing vocals
Paul Fauerso – keyboards, programming, percussion, backing vocals
John Stamos – drums on "Getcha Back" and "10,000 Years Ago", vocals on "Do It Again"
Laurence Juber – guitar
Cliff Hugo – bass guitar
Dave Koz – saxophone on "All the Love In Paris"
Adrian Baker – backing vocals
John Jorgenson – guitar
John Cowsill – drums, lead vocals on "Wild Honey"
AJR – vocals on "Darlin'"
Christian Love – backing vocals
Brian Love – backing vocals
Donny Gerrard – backing vocals
Hayleigh Love – backing vocals
Edna Wright – backing vocals
Ambha Love – lead vocals on "The Warmth of the Sun"

Chart performance
 Billboard Independent Albums – #37

References

2017 albums
Mike Love albums
Albums produced by Michael Lloyd (music producer)